is a district of Naka Ward in Yokohama, Japan, consisting mainly of the .

The largest shops and businesses are in the Isezaki Mall area in the northeast end, closer to Kannai Station. As you walk along the Isezakicho Shopping Street towards 7-chōme in the southwest end, the shops become gradually smaller and the pedestrian traffic tapers off. On the other end, walking past the northeast end of Isezakicho, across towards Kannai Station, the street continues into the Bashamichi Street.

Until the 1960s, Isezakicho was the only large shopping area in Yokohama catering to local residents.  But that was before Motomachi and the Yokohama Station area became more popular.  Motomachi had previously catered mainly to foreign residents, while the Yokohama Station developed into a large shopping area only in the 1970s.  Today, Isezakicho continues to be one of the major shopping areas of Yokohama.

Isezakichō is featured in the video game Yakuza: Like a Dragon and in Lost Judgment as Isezaki Ijincho.

Education
The  operates public elementary and junior high schools.

1-4 chome are zoned to Honcho Elementary School (本町小学校), while 5-7 chome are zoned to Azuma Elementary School (東小学校). 1-4 chome are also zoned to Yokohama Yoshida Junior High School (横浜吉田中学校), while Azuma feeds into Oimatsu Junior High School (老松中学校).

Seiryo High School, depicted in Sega's Lost Judgment game (2021) is nor far from the area.

Major Attractions 
 Yurindo Bookstore, Main Location 
 Fujiya  (This is the 2nd Fujiya restaurant ever opened.  The 1st store in Motomachi no longer exists.)

References 
This article was translated from the corresponding article in the Japanese Wikipedia, retrieved on September 10, 2006, and with a few minor changes.

External links 
  Isezaki Mall (official website), 1-chōme & 2-chōme
  Isezakicho Shopping Street (official website), 3-chōme through 7-chōme

Naka-ku, Yokohama
Neighborhoods of Yokohama
Shopping districts and streets in Japan